Schwendi (Swabian: Schwende) is a municipality in the district Biberach, Baden-Württemberg, Germany, located near Laupheim. The mayor is Mr. Wolfgang Späth, elected in March 2019.

References

Biberach (district)
Württemberg